Axceler, Inc. was a software company specializing in administration, governance, and migration software for Microsoft SharePoint and Lotus Notes. Operating since 1994 and with over 2,000 customers worldwide, Axceler was headquartered in Woburn, Massachusetts. 

Axceler's SharePoint assets were purchased by Metalogix Software on August 28, 2013 from parent company PowerTools Inc., and included ControlPoint for SharePoint Administration, ControlPoint for SharePoint Migration, and ControlPoint FileLoader, among others. The portion of the business that developed, marketed, and sold solutions of IBM Notes and for collaboration visibility became a new company named ViewDo Labs.

Products 
Axceler's ControlPoint for SharePoint Administration was a governance and administration solution for SharePoint - on-premises, in the cloud, or in a hybrid environment - that included a governance policy manager.

Axceler offered two SharePoint migration tools - ControlPoint for SharePoint Migration (formerly Davinci Migrator) providing SharePoint migration capabilities and ControlPoint FileLoader which provided Windows file share migration into SharePoint.

In 2012, Axceler announced ViewPoint, an enterprise collaboration governance tool for platforms like SharePoint, Yammer and others.

Axceler's ControlPoint won Best SharePoint Product of 2009 from Windows IT Pro. In 2011, Axceler won the Best of Connections SharePoint Product award as well as receiving the Windows IT Pro Editors' Best Choice award.

Notes

Software companies based in Massachusetts
American companies established in 1994
Defunct software companies of the United States